Josepablo Monreal Villablanca  (born 1 April 1996) is a Chilean professional footballer who plays as striker for Primera B de Chile club Unión San Felipe.

Career
His first formative incursion to professional football began in Colo-Colo in 2005, in this club he won the Torneo ANFP Sub-11 año 2007 with 22 goal scored.

He changed of formative club in 2010 to Universidad Católica, after his successfully ingress in a massive test, approved by Hugo Balladares, who he was a Coach in this football club at that time. In this club he won the ANFP Sub-15 in 2011, with 35 matches and 22 goal scored. He was awarded as top striker of the Campeonato Sub-17 in 2013, and Campeonato sub-19 in 2014.

He was invited to train with the Mexican Professional football club Monterrey in 2015.

He participated in Copa Chivas and Copa Nike, international tournaments.

He began his professional career in Club de Deportes Cobreloa in 2016, he signs for this club for Primera B de Chile season 2016–17. He made his professional debut in Cobreloa vs. Deportes Antofagasta match, valid for first round of Copa Chile 2016 tournament. He scored his first goal in his career in his second professional match against Deportes Antofagasta, valid for Copa Chile 2016 tournament.

In 2022, he had a stitn in Europe with Finnish side SJK. 

In 2023, he returned to his homeland and joined Unión San Felipe.

Career statistics

Club

References

External links
 Josepablo Monreal's Talents Agency Profile at Trading Sports
 

1996 births
Living people
Footballers from Santiago
Chilean footballers
Association football forwards
Primera B de Chile players
Cobreloa footballers
Curicó Unido footballers
Rangers de Talca footballers
Unión San Felipe footballers
Ascenso MX players
Dorados de Sinaloa footballers
Chilean Primera División players
Unión La Calera footballers
Veikkausliiga players
Seinäjoen Jalkapallokerho players
Ykkönen players
SJK Akatemia players
Chilean expatriate footballers
Expatriate footballers in Mexico
Chilean expatriate sportspeople in Mexico
Expatriate footballers in Finland
Chilean expatriate sportspeople in Finland